Comacmaeops is a genus of beetles in the family Cerambycidae, containing the following species:

 Comacmaeops brunnea (Knull, 1962)
 Comacmaeops parva Linsley & Chemsak, 1972

References

Lepturinae